Nancy Ruth Rowell Jackman  (born January 6, 1942) is a Canadian heiress, activist, philanthropist and former Canadian Senator. She was appointed by Prime Minister Paul Martin, on March 24, 2005. While initially appointed as a Progressive Conservative, on March 28, 2006 she joined the Conservative caucus. She was Canada's first openly lesbian senator.   She retired from the Senate on January 6, 2017, upon reaching the mandatory retirement age of 75.

Life and career
Nancy Ruth was born in Toronto, Ontario, and is an alumna of Branksome Hall. Before being appointed to the Senate, Nancy Ruth was a social activist and philanthropist. She founded several women's organizations in Canada, including the Canadian Women's Foundation and a women's studies chair at Mount Saint Vincent University. She has also been a noted benefactor of hospitals and art galleries throughout Canada, and was named a member of the Order of Canada in 1994.

She has long battled for women's constitutional rights and thus opposed the Charlottetown Accord in 1992. She is also a vocal opponent of pornography. Her support for tougher child pornography laws made her a controversial figure amongst other gay rights activists, who saw the legislation as dangerously ambiguous in its definitions and broad in scope.

She was born Nancy Ruth (Rowell) Jackman, and is the sister of former Lieutenant Governor of Ontario Hal Jackman, the daughter of former Member of Parliament Harry Jackman and the granddaughter of former MP and Ontario Liberal Party leader Newton Rowell.  She changed her name in the mid-1990s; she does not use "Ruth" as a last name, instead using both her names as given names with no last name, and therefore prefers to be known as "Senator Nancy Ruth" instead of "Senator Ruth." She is alphabetized under "N," not "R", on the Senate website.

A Red Tory, she stood as a candidate for the Progressive Conservative Party of Ontario on two occasions in the early 1990s, when she was known as Nancy Jackman. The first was in the 1990 provincial election, when she lost to New Democratic Party candidate Zanana Akande by fewer than 1,000 votes in the riding of St. Andrew—St. Patrick. On April 1, 1993, she lost to Liberal Tim Murphy by over 2,000 votes in a by-election held in St. George—St. David. In 1997, she was the recipient of the Governor General's Award in Commemoration of the Persons Case.

Nancy Ruth crossed party lines to endorse Kathleen Wynne in her bid to win the leadership of the Ontario Liberal Party in 2013; she donated $10,000 to the Liberal MPP's campaign.

Controversies

Rewording Canadian national anthem
In 2010, Nancy Ruth took credit for the Throne Speech's including a proposal to study changing the line of "O Canada" from "all thy sons command" to "thou dost in us command", the original wording. Intense public backlash caused the Prime Minister's Office to announce the issue had been dropped from consideration.

Comments to women's equality rights groups
Nancy Ruth sparked controversy on May 3, 2010, with comments she made during a meeting with women's equality rights groups on Parliament Hill. The groups were among many who had leveled criticisms at the Conservative government for maintaining their refusal to include funding for abortions in their maternal health plan for the G8, even after finally agreeing to include family planning measures such as contraception. Nancy Ruth fired back at the groups, telling them, "We've got five weeks or whatever left until the G8 starts. Shut the fuck up on this issue," she said. "If you push it, there'll be more backlash. This is now a political football. This is not about women's health in this country". Nancy Ruth also said, "Canada is still a country with free and accessible abortion. Leave it there. Don't make this an election issue."

The next day the Conservative government cut funding to 11 women's groups, some of which support abortion as part of the G8 maternal health initiative.

Response to auditors' questions
Nancy Ruth drew media attention again in 2015 when responding to reporters regarding the auditor general's questioning why she claimed separate breakfasts as public expenses when she could have eaten the airline breakfasts included in the price of her airline ticket, which she had also expensed. She is quoted as saying "Well, those breakfasts are pretty awful" and "If you want ice-cold camembert with broken crackers, have it!" The comments drew criticism as evidence of senators feeling entitled to a certain lifestyle at public expense.

Archives 
There is a Nancy Ruth fonds at Library and Archives Canada. The archival reference number is R442, former archival reference number MG30-D408. The fonds covers the date range 1980 to 2006 and contains: 1.85 meters of textual records; 79 photographs : col. slides ; 35 mm; and 15 photographs : 15 col.

See also
List of Ontario senators

References

External links

 
1942 births
21st-century Canadian politicians
Canadian senators from Ontario
Women members of the Senate of Canada
Conservative Party of Canada senators
Lesbian politicians
Canadian LGBT senators
Living people
Members of the Order of Canada
Members of the United Church of Canada
Politicians from Toronto
Progressive Conservative Party of Ontario candidates in Ontario provincial elections
Progressive Conservative Party of Canada senators
Women in Ontario politics
21st-century Canadian women politicians
Governor General's Award in Commemoration of the Persons Case winners
21st-century Canadian LGBT people